The Golf Hotel is a hotel and restaurant in Crail, Fife, Scotland. It is a Category A listed building dating to the early 18th century, although one source claims it is 16th century.

John Dickson, a sergeant major in the Royal Scots Greys who fought in the 1815 Battle of Waterloo, became a landlord at the establishment when it was known as the Golf Inn. He was the last known Scot involved in the battle when he died, aged 97.

See also
 List of listed buildings in Crail, Fife
 List of Category A listed buildings in Fife

References

External links

Listed buildings in Crail
Hotels in Fife
Hotel buildings completed in the 18th century
Listed hotels in Scotland
Category A listed buildings in Fife
18th-century establishments in Scotland